Street Sports Basketball is a 1987 computer basketball game for the IBM PC, Amstrad CPC, Amiga, Apple II, Commodore 64 and ZX Spectrum. It was developed by Epyx and published by U.S. Gold.

Gameplay 
The game features a 3-a-side basketball match. Each team is made by three players with different skills chosen from the neighbours.

Reception
Computer Gaming World stated in 1987 that Street Sports Basketballs "graphics are smooth and the action is fast". The game was reviewed in 1988 in Dragon #131 by Hartley, Patricia, and Kirk Lesser in "The Role of Computers" column. The reviewers gave the game 3 out of 5 stars.

Reviews
Info (Jan, 1989)
Happy Computer (Dec, 1987)
Power Play (1987)
Commodore User (Jan, 1988)
Zzap! (Dec, 1988)
Génération 4 (Dec, 1988)
Sinclair User (Jul, 1988)
Your Sinclair (Aug, 1988)
Power Play (Mar, 1988)
Power Play (Dec, 1988)
Amiga User International (Dec, 1988)

References

External links
Street Sports Basketball  at Stadium 64
Street Sports Basketball at hol.abime.net

1987 video games
DOS games
Amiga games
Amstrad CPC games
Apple II games
Commodore 64 games
ZX Spectrum games
Basketball video games
U.S. Gold games
Video games developed in the United States
Epyx games